Cho Hun (born 24 September 1968) is a North Korean gymnast. He competed in seven events at the 1992 Summer Olympics.

References

1968 births
Living people
North Korean male artistic gymnasts
Olympic gymnasts of North Korea
Gymnasts at the 1992 Summer Olympics
Place of birth missing (living people)
20th-century North Korean people